Morishita Station is the name of three train stations in Japan:

 Morishita Station (Aichi)
 Morishita Station (Fukuoka)
 Morishita Station (Tokyo)